Callopizoma malgassica is a species of Lasiocampidae moth native to Madagascar.

They have a wingspan of 66 mm.

References

External links
Picture at boldsystems.org

Lasiocampidae
Lepidoptera of Madagascar
Moths described in 1914
Moths of Madagascar
Moths of Africa